Urd was a Norwegian women's magazine that existed from 1879 to 1958.

History and profile
Urd was named after Urðr, a guardian of the Yggdrasil in Norse mythology. It was founded by sisters Cecilie and Anna Bøe in 1879. Anna was the editor-in-chief until 1933, whereas Cecilie had responsibility for finance. The magazine was marked by a higher content of art and culture than many other women's magazines, and had a distinct faith in progress, and a Christian profile. It also included articles concerning the struggle for women’s suffrage.

The magazine became defunct in 1958 due to weak finances.

References

External links

1879 establishments in Norway
1958 disestablishments in Norway
Defunct magazines published in Norway
Lifestyle magazines
Magazines established in 1879
Magazines disestablished in 1958
Norwegian-language magazines
Weekly magazines published in Norway
Women's magazines published in Norway